Sunket is a village in Morthad mandal, Nizamabad district, Telangana, India, it is just 7 km from the Nizamabad-Manchiryal highway ie; through Mortad, The famous of the village is Sai Baba Temple and Sri Venkateshwara Swami Temple. About 3500 people are living in the village. Lot of people migrated for Gulf countries for work. The village with lot of resources for Agriculture but not as much as developed due to lack of UNITY and proper planning. village has lot of problems which needs to be resolved by public representatives.

Villages in Nizamabad district